Goubla is a village in the Toece Department of Bazèga Province in central Burkina Faso. The village has a population of 512.

References

External links
 Satellite map at Maplandia.com
 Coordinates of Goubla

Populated places in the Centre-Sud Region
Bazèga Province